Vishnu Deva (born 18 May 1975) is an Indian choreographer who has worked in Hindi, Tamil, Telugu, Malayalam, and Bengali and Nepali films. Since 2000, he has choreographed different types of dance styles, and is known for his work on the Bollywood movies Goliyon Ki Rasleela Ram-Leela (2013), Singh Is Bliing (2015), Baby (2015), R... Rajkumar (2013), Rowdy Rathore (2012), and Dabangg 2 (2012)"paaword"nepali movie.

Early life and career
Born and raised in Chennai, Deva grew up watching his father, a well-known choreographer in Malayalam movies, working on dancing rehearsals, leading him to develop an interest in choreography. In 1995, he began working with choreographers including Chinni Prakash and Tharun Kumar. In 2000, he met and began working with choreographer Ganesh Acharya. In 2002, when Deva was working as an assistant choreographer on Shakti: The Power, he happened to meet choreographer Prabhu Deva, who later asked him to assist in the film Lakshya song "Main Aisa Kyon Hoon". Later, Prabhu Deva offered him solo choreography for the Telugu film Nuvvostanante Nenoddantana.

Personal life
Deva is the brother of South Indian actress Nalini Ramarajan. He married Kamla Nair, the sister of Bollywood choreographer Ganesh Acharya, on 29 November 1998. The couple has one child, Aishwarya.

Filmography

Awards
Apsara Film & Television Producers Guild Award
 Nominated, Apsara Award for Best Choreography in Goliyon Ki Raasleela Ram-Leela for the songs "Ishqyaun Dhishqyuan" & "Ram Chahe Leela"

Zee Cine Awards
 Nominated, Technical Award for Best Choreography in Rowdy Rathore for the song "Aa Re Pritam Pyare"

References

External links
 

1975 births
Indian choreographers
Living people
Dancers from Tamil Nadu